Fulke Greville, 1st Baron Brooke, de jure 13th Baron Latimer and 5th Baron Willoughby de Broke KB PC (3 October 1554 – 30 September 1628), known before 1621 as Sir Fulke Greville, was an Elizabethan poet, dramatist, and statesman who sat in the House of Commons at various times between 1581 and 1621, when he was raised to the peerage.

Greville was a capable administrator who served the English Crown under Elizabeth I and James I as, successively, treasurer of the navy, chancellor of the exchequer, and commissioner of the Treasury, and who for his services was in 1621 made Baron Brooke, peer of the realm. Greville was granted Warwick Castle in 1604, making numerous improvements. Greville is best known today as the biographer of Sir Philip Sidney, and for his sober poetry, which presents dark, thoughtful and  views on art, literature, beauty and other philosophical matters.

Life
Fulke Greville, born 3 October 1554, at Beauchamp Court, near Alcester, Warwickshire, was the only son of Sir Fulke Greville (1536–1606) and Anne Neville (d. 1583), the daughter of Ralph Neville, 4th Earl of Westmorland. He was the grandson of Sir Fulke Greville (d. 10 November 1559) and Elizabeth Willoughby (buried 15 November 1562), eldest daughter of Robert Willoughby, 2nd Baron Willoughby de Broke, the only other child of the marriage was a daughter, Margaret Greville (1561–1631/2), who married Sir Richard Verney.

He was sent in 1564, on the same day as his lifelong friend, Philip Sidney, to Shrewsbury School. He then went up to Jesus College, Cambridge in 1568.

Sir Henry Sidney, Philip's father, and president of the Council of Wales and the Marches, gave Greville in 1576 a post connected with the court of the Welsh Marches, but Greville resigned it in 1577 to go to attend the court of Queen Elizabeth I along with Philip Sidney. There, Greville became a great favourite with the Queen, who valued his sober character and administrative skills. In 1581, he was elected in a by-election as Member of Parliament for Southampton. Queen Elizabeth made him secretary to the principality of Wales in 1583. However, he was put out of favour more than once for leaving the country against her wishes. 

In 1581 at a Whitehall tournament in honour of French ambassadors Greville, Philip Sidney, Philip Howard Earl of Arundel and Frederick Lord Windsor staged an entertainment as the "Four Foster Children of Desire". The ambassadors were working on plans for Elizabeth's marriage to Francis, Duke of Anjou. The "Foster Children" laid siege to the "Fortress of Perfect Beautie". After two days of challenges the Children admitted defeat. The entertainment was understood to convey the idea that Elizabeth was unattainable, devised by the opposition to the French marriage.

Greville, Philip Sidney and Sir Edward Dyer were members of the "Areopagus", the literary clique which, under the leadership of Gabriel Harvey, supported the introduction of classical metres into English verse. Sidney and Greville arranged to sail with Sir Francis Drake in 1585 in his expedition against the Spanish West Indies, but Elizabeth forbade Drake to take them with him, and also refused Greville's request to be allowed to join Robert Dudley's army in the Netherlands. Philip Sidney, who took part in the campaign, was killed on 17 October 1586.  Greville memorialized his beloved friend in A Dedication to Sir Philip Sidney.

Greville participated in the Battle of Coutras in 1587. About 1591 Greville served further for a short time in Normandy under King Henry III of Navarre in the French Wars of Religion. This was his last experience of war.

Greville represented Warwickshire in parliament in 1592–1593, 1597, 1601 and 1621. In 1598 he was made Treasurer of the Navy, and he retained the office through the early years of the reign of James I.

Greville was granted Warwick Castle—situated on a bend of the River Avon in Warwickshire—by King James I in 1604. The castle was in a dilapidated condition when he took possession of it, and he spent £20,000 to restore it.

In 1614 he became chancellor and under-treasurer of the exchequer, and throughout the reign, he was a valued supporter of James I, although in 1615 he advocated the summoning of Parliament. In 1618 he became commissioner of the treasury, and in 1621 he was raised to the peerage with the title of Baron Brooke, a title which had belonged to the family of his paternal grandmother.

Death and legacy
In 1628 Greville was stabbed at his house in Holborn, London by Ralph Haywood, a servant who believed that he had been cheated by being left out of his master's will. Haywood then turned the knife on himself. Greville's physicians treated his wounds by filling them with pig fat. Rather than disinfecting them, the pig fat turned rancid and infected the wounds, and he died in agony four weeks after the attack. His body was brought back to Warwick, and he was buried in the Collegiate Church of St Mary, Warwick, and on his tomb was inscribed the epitaph he had composed:

Greville has numerous streets named after him in the Hatton Garden area of Holborn, London (see Hatton Garden#Street names etymologies).

A line from Chorus Sacerdotum from Mustapha is quoted by Christopher Hitchens in his book Letters to a Young Contrarian.

In 2018 the first-ever festival dedicated to Greville was launched in his home town, Alcester, Warwickshire.

Works
Greville is best known for his biography of Sidney (composed c. 1610–12), which circulated in manuscript with the title A Dedication to Sir Philip Sidney. It was published in 1652 as The Life of the Renowned Sir Philip Sidney. He includes some autobiographical matter in what amounts to a treatise on government.

Greville's poetry consists of closet tragedies, sonnets, and poems on political and moral subjects. His style is grave and sententious.

Greville's works include:

Biography
A Dedication to Sir Philip Sidney
Closet drama
Alaham
Mustapha
Verse poems
Caelica in CX Sonnets
Of Monarchy
A Treatise of Religion
A Treatie of Humane Learning
An Inquisition upon Fame and Honour
A Treatie of Warres
Miscellaneous prose
a letter to an "Honourable Lady",
a letter to Grevill Varney in France,
a short speech delivered on behalf of Francis Bacon

Editions
Greville's works were collected and reprinted by Alexander Balloch Grosart, in 1870, in four volumes. Poetry and Drama of Fulke Greville, edited by Geoffrey Bullough, was published in 1938. The Prose Works of Fulke Greville, edited by John Gouws, were published in 1986.  The Selected Poems of Fulke Greville edited by Thom Gunn, with an afterword by Bradin Cormack, was published in 2009 (University of Chicago Press, .)

The Tragedy of Mustapha (London: Printed by J. Windet for N. Butter, 1609).
Certaine Learned and Elegant Workes (London: Printed by E. Purslowe for H. Seyle, 1633) comprises A Treatise of Humane Learning, An Inquisition upon Fame and Honour, A Treatise of Wars, Alaham, Mustapha, Caelica, A Letter to an Honorable Lady, and A Letter of Travel.
The Remains of Sir Fvlk Grevill Lord Brooke: Being Poems of Monarchy and Religion: Never Before Printed (London: Printed by T. N. for H. Herringman, 1670) comprises A Treatise of Monarchy and A Treatise of Religion.
Poems and Dramas of Fulke Greville, First Lord Brooke, 2 volumes, edited by Geoffrey Bullough (Edinburgh: Oliver & Boyd, 1939; New York: Oxford University Press, 1945) comprises Caelica, A Treatise of Humane Learning, An Inquisition upon Fame and Honor, A Treatise of Wars, Mustapha, and Alaham.
The Remains: Being Poems of Monarchy and Religion, edited by G. A. Wilkes (London: Oxford University Press, 1965) comprises A Treatise of Monarchy and A Treatise of Religion.
The Prose Works Fulke Greville, Lord Brooke, edited by John Guows (Oxford: Oxford University Press, 1997), published as part of the Oxford English Texts series. A scholarly edition of his prose works, with an authoritative text, together with an introduction, commentary notes, and scholarly apparatus.

The principal repository for Fulke Greville's papers is the British Library (Add MSS 54566-54571, the Warwick Manuscripts; letters in the as-yet uncatalogued Earl Cowper mss.). Individual manuscripts of the Dedication to Sir Philip Sidney are to be found at the Bodleian Library, Oxford (a manuscript formerly owned by Dr. B. E. Juel-Jensen); Trinity College, Cambridge (MSS R.7.32 and 33); and the Shrewsbury Library (MS 295).

Critical reception
Charles Lamb commented on Greville: "He is nine parts Machiavel and Tacitus, for one of Sophocles and Seneca... Whether we look into his plays or his most passionate love-poems, we shall find all frozen and made rigid with intellect." He goes on to speak of the obscurity of expression that runs through all of Greville's poetry.

Andrea McCrea sees the influence of Justus Lipsius in the Letter to an Honourable Lady, but elsewhere detects a scepticism more akin to Michel de Montaigne.

A rhyming elegy on Greville, published in Henry Huth's Inedited Poetical Miscellanies, brings charges of miserliness against him.

Robert Pinsky has asserted that this work is comparable in force of imagination to John Donne.

Family
Lord Brooke, who never married, left no natural heirs, and his senior (Brooke) barony passed to his cousin and adopted son, Robert Greville (1608–1643), who took the side of Parliament in the English Civil War, and defeated the Royalists in a skirmish at Kineton in August 1642. Robert was killed during the siege of Lichfield on 2 March 1643, having survived the elder Greville by only fifteen years. His other barony (Willoughby de Broke) was inherited by his sister Margaret who married Sir Richard Verney.

See also

Canons of Elizabethan poetry
List of owners of Warwick Castle

Notes

References

Sources

Further reading
The Prose Works of Fulke Greville, Lord Brooke, edited by John Gouws (Oxford: Clarendon Press, 1986)
Paula Bennet, "Recent Studies in Greville," English Literary Renaissance, 2 (Winter 1972): 376–382.
Ronald Rebholz, The Life of Fulke Greville, First Lord Brooke (Oxford: Clarendon Press, 1971).
Joan Rees, Fulke Greville, Lord Brooke, 1554-1628 (London: Routledge & Kegan Paul, 1971; Berkeley: University of California Press, 1971).
John Gouws, "Fact and Anecdote in Fulke Greville's Account of Sidney's Last Days," in Sir Philip Sidney: 1586 and the Creation of a Legend, edited by Jan van Dorsten and others (Leiden: E. J. Brill/Leiden University Press, 1986), pp. 62–82.
W. Hilton Kelliher, "The Warwick Manuscripts of Fulke Greville," British Museum Quarterly, 34 (1970): 107–121.
Charles Larson, Fulke Greville (Boston: Twayne, 1980).
David Norbrook, "Voluntary Servitude: Fulke Greville and the Arts of Power," in his Poetry and Politics in the English Renaissance (London: Routledge & Kegan Paul, 1984), pp. 157–174.
Richard Waswo, The Fatal Mirror: Themes and Techniques in the Poetry of Fulke Greville (Charlottesville: University of Virginia Press, 1972).
G. A. Wilkes, "The Sequence of the Writings of Fulke Greville, Lord Brooke," Studies in Philology, 56 (July 1959): 489–503.

Attribution

External links

 
 
 Fulke Greville, Lord Brooke at the "Luminarium"

1554 births
1628 deaths
Chancellors of the Exchequer of England
16th-century English poets
16th-century Royal Navy personnel
17th-century English poets
17th-century male writers
17th-century Royal Navy personnel
Alumni of Jesus College, Cambridge
People educated at Shrewsbury School
Knights of the Bath
People from Warwickshire
Members of the Parliament of England for Hedon
English murder victims
Assassinated English politicians
Sonneteers
Burials at the Collegiate Church of St Mary (Warwick)
Fulke
English MPs 1572–1583
English MPs 1584–1585
English MPs 1586–1587
English MPs 1589
English MPs 1593
English MPs 1597–1598
English MPs 1601
English MPs 1621–1622
English male dramatists and playwrights
English male poets
Literary peers
5
1
Privy Councillor (Russian Empire)